Harlan Saperstein is an American voice actor. He has worked as a television narrator of several documentaries on E! True Hollywood Story and History Channel.

Documentaries
 Pioneers Of Television (2007–2008)
 Modern Marvels (1995–2007)
 History's Mysteries: "The Bible Code"
 Decoding the Past: "The Other Nostradamus" (2005)
 Decoding the Past: "Nazi Prophecies" (2005)
 Biography: "Gandhi: Pilgrim of Peace" (2005)
 The Bible Code II: Apocalypse and Beyond (2004)
 Dog Tag Anthologies (2004)
 The E! True Hollywood Story

References

External links
 

Year of birth missing (living people)
Living people
American voice actors